Tanjay, officially the City of Tanjay, is a 4th class component city in the province of Negros Oriental, Philippines. According to the 2020 census, it has a population of 82,642 people.

It became a city by virtue of Republic Act 9026 otherwise known as "An act converting the Municipality of Tanjay, province of Negros Oriental into a component city to be known as the City of Tanjay". The Act was approved and signed by President Gloria Macapagal Arroyo on March 5, 2001. This act, which is a consolidation of House Bill No. 8880 and Senate Bill No. 2256, was finally passed by the House of Representatives and the Senate on February 8, 2001. Tanjay was finally proclaimed a component city on April 1, 2001, after a plebiscite was conducted for the purpose.

It is bounded on the north by Bais, on the south by the Municipality of Amlan, on the east by the Tañon Strait and west by the Municipality of Pamplona. The municipality is home to two indigenous languages, the Minagahat language and the Cebuano language as listed by the Komisyon ng Wikang Filipino. The city is known as the City of Professionals.

History

Señor Santiago and Tanjay
The first map of the Negros Island, dated 1572 and charted by Diego Lopez de Povedano identified it as Buglas, the native reference derived from the tall cane-like grass which ranged thick and persistent over the island. Here, in much earlier times, lived men whose relics and artifacts, dating back to 200–500 AD and the 12th century Song dynasty have turned up in recent excavations were said to have ventured perhaps in the area we now know as Tampi in Amlan. Here, in 1565, Esteban Rodriguez of the Legazpi expedition, caught by storm on his way back to Cebu from Bohol, sought refuge in the eastern shore of the island and came upon squat negroid inhabitants called ata, agta, or ati.

His report upon returning to Cebu prompted Fray Andrés de Urdaneta to visit the island, landing in what is now Escalante in Negros Occidental. In the same year, Capitan Mateo de Cadiz led a small expedition which reached an area near Tanjay. Capitan Miguel de Loarca followed with a bigger expedition and force and proceeded to lay claim to what the Spaniards now call Negros. Both Diego Lopez de Povedano and Capitan Manuel de Loarca pointed to the Tanjay – Dumaguete area as the most densely populated in the eastern half of the island. Tanjay, considered the more important settlement, was made the Administrative Capital of Oriental Negros. It however, remained under the jurisdiction of the province of Cebu. It was the first archdeacon of Cebu, Fray Diego Ferreira, who sent Fray Gabriel Sanchez and other Augustinian priests to the new territory. Thus on June 11, 1580, the mission of Tanjay was founded. It became the center of religious supervision for Dumaguete, Marabago, Siaton and Manalongon.Tanjay City Information and Guide

From these few parishes along the coast, the priests administered the sacraments to the people in the hinterlands and served as mission to the wandering Malays, converting them to Christianity. Evangelization began very slowly because of the great distance over hills from one hut to another.

By 1587, the Augustinians had almost abandoned all missions in Oriental Negros due to lack of manpower. Evidence, however, points to a secular priest in charge of the Parish of Tanjay before 1602. It was in 1600 that these missions regained pastoral attention when the Jesuits were assigned in Negros. The first priest of Tanjay, Fray Diego Ferreira, was appointed in 1589. Tanjay parish, under the patronage of St. James the greater is the oldest in the Oriental coasts.

Parish of Tanjay

The Christian faith was brought to this part of Oriental Negros by the Augustinian Fathers. In the Definitorium dated June 11, 1580, it made mention of the foundation of the Parish of Tanjay, with the communities of Dumaguete, Siaton, Marabago and Manalongon. Due to the lack of personnel on the part of the Augustinian Fathers, the spiritual care of this new foundation was entrusted to the care of the Diocesan Clergy of Cebu. This is why the reason Tanjay Parish became part of the Diocese of Cebu.

Later in 1851, at the request of the Bishop of Cebu, the Augustinian Recollect Fathers took over the spiritual care of the Parish and up to the time the diocesan clergy again took over. Then when the Diocese of Jaro was erected in 1865, Tanjay as part of Negros became part of the Diocese (since the whole island was made part of the new Diocese). And then, when the Diocese of Bacolod was erected in 1933, again, Tanjay became part of this new Diocese (since Oriental Negros and Siquijor were made part of the new Diocese). And in 1955, Tanjay became part of the Diocese of Dumaguete. Up to the present, it is still part of the Diocese of Dumaguete.

From the Parish of Tanjay, came later the following parishes: Dumaguete was separated in 1620; Amlan in 1848; Siaton in 1848; Bacong (Marabago) in 1849; San Jose (Ayuquitan) in 1895. And when Dumaguete became a Diocese, again two more parishes were taken from Tanjay: Pamplona in 1960, and Santa Cruz in 1969.

Sinulog de Tanjay
The Sinulog is purely Tanjay tradition. It is a religious devotional festive dance with a mock battle depicting the war between the Moros and the Christians in Granada, Spain in centuries past. It is based on the legend that St. James miraculously aided the Christians by riding on white horse from the heavens and slew hundreds of Moors.

Thus, the Sinulog is a religious exercise glorifying the Christians and honoring the feast day of Señor Santiago who is the patron saint of Tanjay and also of Spain.

The Sinulog was first performed in this town in 1814, under the auspices of the Catholic Church with Fr. Fernando Felix de Zuñiga (1814–1816) as Parish Priest. It then became the highlight of every fiesta celebration during the incumbencies of succeeding parish priests from the brothers Fr. Pedro Bracamonte (1816–1839; 1843–1847) and Fr. Luciano Bracamonte (1839–1842) to Fr. Jorge Gargacilla (1885–1889). Fr. Jorge Adan (1889–1898) dispensed with the Sinulog in 1897 for reasons known only to him, but then his successor Fr. Baldomero Villareal (1898–1929) revived it in 1904 until the end of his term in 1929. There was Sinulog performance for two fiestas during the term of Fr. Gregorio Santiagudo as Parish Priest in 1930–1931.

In 1932, through the initiative of group of laymen from Tabuc (now Barangay San Isidro) and Ilaud, the Sinulog was again a part of the Tanjay fiesta celebration through the years until the outbreak of the Second World War in the Pacific in 1941. The war ended in 1945 but the Sinulog came to be resumed only in 1947 and continued to be an annual fiesta spectacle until 1970 when most of the long-time devotee participants were already too old to perform, or had already died.

In the early 1970s, the Sinulog devotion was taken over by a group of elementary school children from Ilaud under Alfred Garcia, a schoolteacher and lone survivor of the old-time Sinulog team. Until the 1987 fiesta, the Sinulog had been a children's affair. Although the children's Sinulog bore the spirit of the Tanjay fiesta celebration, it was evident that they lacked the right expressive moments and authenticity of the former groups which were composed by matured men.

Because of its high historical and cultural value, the Sinulog was featured at the Folk Arts Theater in 1981. Later, in the year 1988, a significant milestone in Tanjay's Sinulog history was attained. In the spirit of love and concern – of cherishing what is really ours, and of keeping and preserving a beautiful Tanjay tradition – then Tanjay mayor Arturo S. Regalado introduced a Sinulog contest as the highlight of that year's fiesta celebration. His purpose was to revive the real Sinulog de Tanjay, and for the different participating groups to recapture the art and skill as well as the logical movements and sequence of the Sinulog in the past. It was the then mayor's aim to let the contesting groups portray the Sinulog dance and mock battle with the right grace and ability, the right logical sequence of movements, and the ability to elicit the air and spirit of festivity. Above all, he also wanted the contestants to re-live the authenticity of the Sinulog that Tanjay used to witness in the past which our forefathers proudly termed as the "Sinulog de Tanjay", the original Sinulog.

There was a short period during the tenure of the then mayor Baltazar T. Salma that the name Sinulog de Tanjay was changed to Saulog de Tanjay for reasons that they say it connoted the Sinulog de Cebu and thus had it changed to Saulog de Tanjay. After some time, the original name was preserved to reinstate the original Sinulog de Tanjay.

Choreographed street dancing with a finale is incorporated with the mock battle to make for a more artistic and colorful Sinulog. Also present is a Sinulog Merry-Making Contest in the evening of July 23. The Sinulog de Tanjay finale on July 24 is immediately followed by an endurance contest.

World War II 
In 1942, Imperial Japanese Army arrived in Tanjay. During the Japanese occupation of Tanjay, and at the height of enforced collaboration to the community by the Japanese imperial forces under the threat of summary execution, the following were appointed mayors for brief intervals: Concejo Calumpang de Martinez, Perfecto Calumpang and José E. Romero who at the time had just returned from Manila while the Commonwealth government was in exile and after having just survived the sinking of SS Corregidor, which resulted in the death of former senator Hermenegildo Villanueva, his son Jesus Pablo Villanueva, the academic supervisor of Negros Oriental Juanito Calumpang and his daughter Carolina Calumpang, among many other Visayans.

In 1945, Filipino soldiers of the 6th, 7th, 73rd and 75th Infantry Division of the Philippine Commonwealth Army and the 6th and 7th Constabulary Regiment of the Philippine Constabulary were helped by the recognized guerrillas to fight the Japanese imperial forces to liberate Tanjay.

Post-World War II
In 1950, the barrio of Pamplona was made into a separate municipality.

Geography
It is the only city in Negros Oriental with a very wide flat lowland, although mountainous and rolling hills are found in the hinterland barangays of Santo Niño and Pal-ew. Rugged areas can also be found in Barangays Bahi-an and Santa Cruz Nuevo.

Barangays

Tanjay City is politically subdivided into 24 barangays, 9 of which are located within the poblacion.

Climate

Tanjay has a moderate and pleasant climate. It is characterized by a relatively wet season from May to February and dry season from March to April. Rainfall occurs throughout the year with the heaviest volume during the months of July and August. The months of March and April are the hottest months and the coldest is December. January is the humid month while April is the least humid period. The months of November and December have the strongest wind velocities throughout the year.

Demographics

Economy

Government
The last capitán municipal of Tanjay at the end of the Spanish regime was Don José Teves Muñoz. Prior to this, he was gobernadorcillo. Don Agapito Calumpang, who was a cabeza de barangay, was also a former gobernadorcillo of Tanjay.

Upon the arrival of the Americans and the reorganization of local political structures, Don José Teves Muñoz was appointed as presidente municipal while Don Agapito Calumpang was appointed as vice presidente municipal. Andres Molas was appointed as town secretary, Lucas Rodriguez as town treasurer, Pelagio Lopez as chief of police and Felix Calumpang Barot as justice of the peace.

The following is a list of mayors and vice mayors of Tanjay from 1901 to the present.

Tourism
Tanjay City is also known for its Tourism Program which started in the late 1980s. Through a recent Sangguniang Panglunsod Resolution, the city is now dubbed as the City of Festivals. The major tourist attractions are:
 Children's Festival (January)
 Festival of Hearts (February)
 Sinulog sa Tanjay (July)
 Paaway sa Kabayo (July)
 Pasko sa Tanjay (December)
 Bodbod Festival (December)
 Banog-banog Festival (December)
 Park Cafe (Wednesdays & Fridays)
 Sugbaanay sa Parque (Saturdays)
 Museo Eclesiastico de Tanjay (Barangay Poblacion 2)
 Rizal Park & the Dancing Fountain (Barangay Poblacion 2)
 Reef's Farm (Barangay Luca)

There are also potential tourist attractions pending to be debuted to the public as well:
 St. James The Greater Parish-Oldest parish of Negros Oriental (Barangay Poblacion 2)
 Philippine Carabao Center (Barangay Sta. Cruz Viejo)
 Camp Leon Kilat (Barangay Sta. Cruz Viejo)
 Luparan Falls and Caves (Barangay Sta. Cruz Nuevo)
 Bobong Falls (Barangay Bahian)
 Azagra Golf Course (Barangay Azagra)
 Rice Terraces (Barangay Pal-ew)
 Benguet Mining Tunnel (Barangay San Miguel)
 Mambulong & Cang-ogis Lakes (Barangay Pal-ew)
 Red Land Scenic Views (Barangay Sta. Cruz Nuevo)
 Water Spring & Cave with Stalactites & Stalagmites (Barangay Sto. Niño)
 Casa de las Dueñas, Hacienda Santa Escolástica (Barangay San Jose)
 Parao Boardwalk and Mainit Hot Springs (Barangay Luca)
 Tanjay City Boulevard (Barangay Poblacions 4 & 7)
 Lawton Seaport (Barangay Poblacion 7)
 Tanjay City River

Notable personalities

 Chanda Romero, Filipino actress.
 Eddie Romero, National Artist of the Philippines for Cinema and Broadcast Arts.
 Jose E. Romero, Filipino statesman.
 Jose V. Romero Jr., Filipino diplomat.
 Emilio Yap, Filipino businessman.

References

External links

 [ Philippine Standard Geographic Code]
Philippine Census Information
Local Governance Performance Management System

Cities in Negros Oriental
Populated places established in 1580
1580 establishments in the Philippines
Component cities in the Philippines